The Ollé Prize is an Australian chemistry award administered by the Royal Australian Chemical Institute (RACI). Archibald Ollé was very active in the chemical and scientific life of New South Wales (NSW) in the first 40 years of the twentieth century, and his wife left a bequest to RACI, NSW Branch, to establish an annual prize in his name. It is awarded to a member of the Institute who submits the "best treatise, writing or paper" on any subject relevant to the Institute's interests. The Ollé Prize from the RACI is distinct and unrelated to a similarly named prize from the Royal Society of NSW.

The NSW Branch Committee controls the Prize and has established the following conditions:
 Nominations are invited from candidates themselves or from persons knowing suitable candidates.
 Nominees must be members of RACI.
 Each nominee should submit a single scientific work which has been published during the previous calendar year.
 Nominations must be in writing, setting out the name, address, academic qualifications and present position of the nominee and be signed by the nominee and nominator.
 Where the work involves more than one author, the nominator should arrange for all the other authors to send an indication of the contribution of the nominee. Though submission of multi-authored works is not discouraged, authors should be aware that in the past the adjudicators have found it very difficult to establish the relative merits of single and multi-authored works in terms of making an award to an individual.

Past recipients of the award are 
 1964–65: J. E. Falk, Porphyrins and Metallo Porphyrins, CSIRO Canberra, Book. 
 1966: S. J. Angyal, Conformational Analysis (Authors Eliel, Allinger, Angyal & Morrison), UNSW, Book Chapter.
 1967: S. E. Livingstone, "Metal Complexes of Ligands containing Sulphur, Selenium, or Thallium as Donor Atoms"', UNSW, Review.
 1968: D. L. Solomon, Organic Film Formers, CSIRO Melbourne, Book. 
 1969: W. L. F. Armarego, Fused Pyrimidines, Part 1 Quinolizidines, ANU, Book.
 1970: Not awarded
 1971: Not awarded
 1972: D. L. Kepert, The Early Transition Metals, University of Western Australia, Book. 
 1973: Not awarded
 1974: R. L. Martin, "Structural Theory for Non-Stoichiometry Part 1 Defect Fluoride Structures", ANU, Research Paper.
 1975: Not awarded
 1976–77: R. F. Cane, "The Origin and Formation of Oil Shale"', Qld Institute of Technology, Book Chapter in Oil Shale. 
 1978: A. R. H. Cole, Tables of Wave Numbers for Calibration of Infrared Spectrometer, University of Western Australia, Book. 
 1979: B. Selinger, Chemistry in the Market Place, ANU, Book. 
 1980: I. C. Watt, "Sorption of Water Vapor by Keratin", CSIRO Sydney, Review.
 L.A. Summers, The Bipyridinium-Herbicides, University of Newcastle, Book. 
 1981: Not awarded
 1982: D. J. Swaine, "Nickel in Coal and Fly Ash", CSIRO Sydney, Book Chapter in Nickel in the Environment 
 1983: A. J. Hunter, Zeta Potential in Colloid Science, University of Sydney, Book. 
 1984: Not awarded
 1985: D. Napper, University of Sydney, Book.
 1986: Not awarded
 1987: R. Schoenfeld, The Chemist's English, University of Melbourne, Book. 
 1988: Not awarded
 1989: L. F. Lindoy, "Heavy Metal Chemistry of Mixed Donor Macrocyclic Ligands: Strategies for obtaining Metal Ion Recognition", James Cook University, Review.
 1990: A. Albert, Xenobiosis: Foods, Drugs and Poisons, ANU, Book. 
 1991: Len Weickhardt, Masson of Melbourne; The Life and Times of Professor David Orme Masson, University of Melbourne, Book. 
 1992: Paul Haddad, Ion Chromatography, Principles & Applications, UNSW, Book. 
 1993: John Mackie, "Partial Oxidation of Methane: the Role of the Gas-Phase Reactions", Sydney University, Research Paper.
 Leo Radom, "Chemistry by Computer: a Theoretical Approach to Gas-Phase Ion Chemistry", ANU, Research Paper.
 1994: Roger Bishop, "Ritter-Type Reactions", UNSW, Article.
 1995: Bruce S. Wild, "Optically Active Arsines: Preparations, Uses and Chiroptical Properties", ANU, Book Chapter in Organic Arsenic, Antimony and Bismuth Compounds. 
 Lewis Mander, "Stereoselective Synthesis", ANU, Book Chapter in Stereochemistry of Organic Compounds 
 1996: R. G. Gilbert, Emulsion Polymerisation – a Mechanistic Approach, University of Sydney, Book. 
 1997: Des Brown & Damon Ridley, Quinazolines. Supplement 1: The Chemistry of Heterocyclic Compounds (Brown) On Line Searching: A Scientist’s Perspective (Ridley), Book. 
 1998: Frank Eastwood, "Gas Phase Pyrolytic Methods for the Preparation of Carbon-Hydrogen & Carbon-Hydrogen-Oxygen Compounds", Review.
 1999: William S. Price, "NMR Imaging", University of Western Sydney, Review.
 2000: Christopher Easton and Stephen Lincoln, Modified Cyclodextrins – Scaffolds and Templates for Supramolecular Chemistry, Book. 
 2001: Leonard F. Lindoy and Ian M. Atkinson, Self-Assembly in Supramolecular Systems, Book. 
 2002: Robert V. Stick, Carbohydrates: The Sweet Molecules of Life, University of Western Australia, Book. 
 2003: Not awarded
 2004: Peter Karuso, "Epicocconone, a Novel Fluorescent Compound from the Fungus Epicoccum nigrum", Macquarie University, Research Paper. 
 2005: Colin Wrigley, Encyclopedia of Grain Science, Book. 
 2006: Michael Davies, "The Oxidative Environment And Protein Damage", Research Paper
2007: Stephen Lincoln, Challenged Earth: An Overview of Humanity's Stewardship of Earth, University of Adelaide, Book. 
 2008: Brynn Hibbert, Quality Assurance in the Analytical Chemistry Laboratory, UNSW, Book. 
 2009: Stuart R. Batten, Coordination Polymers. Design, Analysis and Application, Book. 
 2010: William S. Price, "NMR Studies of Translational Motion", University of Western Sydney, Nanoscale Group, Monograph. 
2011: Mark Blaskovich, "Handbook on Syntheses of Amino Acids". Published in April 2010 by Oxford University Press, and commissioned by the American Chemical Society
2012: Not awarded
2013: Siegbert Schmid, Chapters 3–7 of the textbook 'Chemistry. Second Edition' by Blackman, Bottle, Schmid, Mocerino, Wille
2014: Joseph J Brophy, "Melaleucas: their biology, essential oils and uses" Book
2015: Stephen Pyne, "The Boronic Acide Mannich Reaction" S.G. Pyne and M. Tang. Organic Reactions 2014, Vol. 83, Chapter 2, pp 211-498.
2016:  Ronald Clarke, "Pumps, Channels and Transporters: Methods of Functional Analysis"
2017: Not awarded
 2018: Mark Blaskovic, "The periodic table: from its classic design to use in popular culture", Institute for Molecular Bioscience at The University of Queensland, article for The Conversation, April 3 2017. 
2019: Not awarded
2020: Michael Gotsbacher, "Reverse Chemical Proteomics Identifies an Unanticipated Human Target of the Antimalarial Artesunate” as published in ACS Chemical Biology (DOI: 10.1021/acschembio.8b01004)

References

 Nanoscale Research at University of Western Sydney
 Royal Australian Chemical Institute Incorporated.

Australian science and technology awards
1964 establishments in Australia
Awards established in 1964